Requiem: Memento Mori is a free-to-play pay to win horror-themed massively multiplayer online role-playing game developed and published by Gravity in 2008.

Gameplay

Plot

Release

The North American site officially launched on February 26, 2008. FilePlanet began offering Closed Beta account keys for the NA/International Server on February 26, 2008, with MMORPG.com and MMOSITE.com set to offer beta keys on Friday, February 29. Closed Beta ended on April 17, 2008. It was extended from March 24.

The Open Beta phase started on May 15, 2008 and ended as of June 12, 2008. Pre-release started on June 16 for those who had purchased a subscription.

Requiem: Bloodymare was released on June 19, 2008. Requiem: Memento Mori/Alive was released on September 25, 2009. The game's official title has switched from Requiem: Bloodymare to Requiem: Memento Mori (USA) and Requiem: Alive (Korean).

Gravity Interactive (USA) acquired the rights and took over development from the Gravity (Korea) Requiem Development Studio in November 2013. An announcement was posted to the official North American web site  on 11/13/2013.

With the first significant update from the new development team at Gravity Interactive the game was given a new season subtitle and was released as: Requiem: Rise of the Reaver which launched on February 20, 2013 
Requiem: Rise of the Reaver web page background

The first significant update from the new development team at Gravity Interactive, titled "Daughters of the Frost Blade", was announced on 2/19/2014 at the official web site.
The "Daughters of the Frost Blade" Update included:
(1) New Story Quests and a New Daily Quest Hub with numerous New Daily Quests
(2) New World Boss: Queen of the Frost Blade Clan, Wintriness
(3) New Accessories aimed at levels 87 and higher
(4) New Xeons (in game crafting system components)
(5) New Compounding Recipes (in game crafting system formulas)
Requiem: Rise of the Reaver icon

The following significant update from the new development team at Gravity Interactive, titled "Rage of Voxyon", was announced on 8/18/2014 at the official web site.
The "Rage of Voxyon" Update included:
(1) New Raid:Voxyon's Lair
(2) New Raid Boss: Voxyon
(3) Voxyon's dropable loot includes new Level 90 Armor Sets
(4) New Quest Hub: Numaren Xenon Outpost includes New Story Quests for Level 70+ and New Daily Quests for Level 70+
(5) New Enchantment Xeons and New Compounding Recipes for Enchantment Xeons (for in game crafting system formulas)
(6) Upgraded Mercenaries (summoned NPC ally system) with Temperion Models now vastly stronger and some will have gained new abilities
(7) Field Boss Wintriness now has a chance to drop Frozen Compression Tokens (for in game crafting system formulas)
(8) Various Bug Fixes for content released since the "Daughters of the Frost Blade" update
Rage of Voxyon banner

Reception

Requiem: Bloodymare received a 3 out of 5 from X-Play, 70% from GamesRadar, and 3 out of 5 from MMOHuts.

References

External links
North American Requiem: Memento Mori website
Korean website
Russian website
SEA Requiem: Alive website

2007 video games
Massively multiplayer online role-playing games
Lua (programming language)-scripted video games
Video games developed in South Korea
Windows games
Windows-only games